Josiah O. Livingston (February 3, 1837–July 23, 1917) was an officer in the Union Army and a Medal of Honor recipient for his actions in the American Civil War.

Livingston joined the 9th Vermont Infantry as a first lieutenant in June 1862, and became regimental adjutant a year later. He was promoted to captain in November 1864.

Medal of Honor citation
Rank and organization: First Lieutenant, and Adjutant, 9th Vermont Infantry. Place and date: At Newport Barracks, N.C., February 2, 1864. Entered service at: Marshfield, Vt. Birth: Walden, Vt. Date of issue: September 8, 1891.

Citation:

When, after desperate resistance, the small garrison had been driven back to the river by a vastly superior force, this officer, while a small force held back the enemy, personally fired the railroad bridge, and, although wounded himself, assisted a wounded officer over the burning structure.

See also

List of Medal of Honor recipients
List of American Civil War Medal of Honor recipients: G–L

References

External links

1837 births
1917 deaths
United States Army Medal of Honor recipients
United States Army officers
Union Army officers
People of Vermont in the American Civil War
People from Caledonia County, Vermont
American Civil War recipients of the Medal of Honor